The Yarada Hills are a range of hills at Yarada to the south of Visakhapatnam City beside the Bay of Bengal in Andhra Pradesh state, India.

Geography
The Yarada Hills, lying between Yarada Beach and Dolphin's Nose, are 3.5 km long with a height of 350 metres .

Tourism
Tourists frequently visit the hills because there is a lighthouse, beach and spectacular city view from here. The Visakhapatnam Metropolitan Region Development Authority is developing a tourism hub.

References

Mountain ranges of India
Visakhapatnam district
Tourist attractions in Visakhapatnam
Geography of Visakhapatnam